Francis P. Wall was an American football player and coach.  He served as the head football coach at New York University (NYU) for one season in 1917, compiling a record of 2–2–3.  Wall played college football at Boston College.

Head coaching record

References

Year of birth missing
Year of death missing
Boston College Eagles football players
NYU Violets football coaches